Aurora is a city in Hamilton County, Nebraska, United States. The population was 4,479 at the 2010 census. It is the county seat of Hamilton County.

History
In 1861, David Millspaw became the first permanent settler in the area of what was to become Aurora. Hamilton County was formed in 1870.

Aurora was laid out as a town in 1871 by David Stone who named it after his former hometown of Aurora, Illinois. The county seat was transferred from Orville City (an extinct town) to Aurora in 1876.

Geography
Aurora is located at  (40.866716, −98.003537).

Demographics

2010 census
At the 2010 census, there were 4,479 people, 1,781 households and 1,199 families in the city. The racial makeup of the city was 97.7% White, 0.4% African American, 0.2% Native American, 0.2% Asian, 0.7% from other races, and 0.8% from two or more races. Hispanic or Latino of any race were 2.4% of the population.

There were 1,781 households, of which 33.7% had children under the age of 18 living with them, 55.7% were married couples living together, 8.5% had a female householder with no husband present, 3.1% had a male householder with no wife present, and 32.7% were non-families. 29.1% of all households were made up of individuals, and 15.3% had someone living alone who was 65 years of age or older. The average household size was 2.45 and the average family size was 3.00.

The median age in the city was 40.4 years. 26.5% of residents were under the age of 18; 5.7% were between the ages of 18 and 24; 23.3% were from 25 to 44; 25.7% were from 45 to 64; and 18.7% were 65 years of age or older. The gender makeup of the city was 48.4% male and 51.6% female.

2000 census
At the 2000 census, there were 4,225 people, 1,662 households and 1,163 families residing in the city. The population density was 2,243.0 per square mile (867.7/km2). There were 1,798 housing units at an average density of 954.5 per square mile (369.3/km2). The racial makeup of the city was 97.92% White, 0.19% African American, 0.05% Native American, 0.43% Asian, 0.57% from other races, and 0.85% from two or more races. Hispanic or Latino of any race were 1.56% of the population.

There were 1,662 households, of which 34.9% had children under the age of 18 living with them, 59.3% were married couples living together, 7.8% had a female householder with no husband present, and 30.0% were non-families. 27.1% of all households were made up of individuals, and 14.1% had someone living alone who was 65 years of age or older. The average household size was 2.45 and the average family size was 2.98.

27.4% of the population were under the age of 18, 6.2% from 18 to 24, 25.7% from 25 to 44, 20.9% from 45 to 64, and 19.7% who were 65 years of age or older. The median age was 39 years. For every 100 females, there were 90.8 males. For every 100 females age 18 and over, there were 84.6 males.

The median household income was $37,690 and the median family income was $43,884. Males had a median income of $29,162 compared with $20,484 for females. The per capita income for the city was $17,309. About 6.1% of families and 6.2% of the population were below the poverty line, including 7.4% of those under age 18 and 5.4% of those age 65 or over.

Education

Public schools
Aurora is served by Aurora Public Schools
 Aurora High School (grades 9 though 12)
 Aurora Middle School (grades 6 through 8)
 Aurora Elementary School (grades PreK through 5)

Media

Radio
 KRGY 97.3FM

Newspaper
 Aurora News-Register

Notable people
Silas Reynolds Barton — U.S. Representative from Nebraska
Harold Eugene Edgerton — inventor of the strobe light
Eugene Jerome Hainer — U.S. Representative from Nebraska
Bob Kremer — Nebraska state senator
Tom Kropp - Professional basketball player
Clarence Mitchell — Major League Baseball player
Terese Nielsen — freelance fantasy artist
Ron Spencer — artist for Magic: The Gathering
Harry Scott Smith - entomologist and educator
William Ledyard Stark — populist politician
Marion Van Berg - thoroughbred trainer in Racing Hall of Fame

References

External links
 City of Aurora, Nebraska
 Aurora News-Register

Cities in Nebraska
Cities in Hamilton County, Nebraska
County seats in Nebraska